Le tournoi des mètres was a French-language Canadian quiz show that aired in 2007 on Télé-Québec. Described in promotional material as "multigenerational", it puts to regions of Québec head to head in competition.

2000s Canadian game shows
Television shows filmed in Quebec
Télé-Québec original programming